Wrenn v. District of Columbia, 864 F.3d 650 (D.C. Cir. 2017), is a United States court case in which the United States Court of Appeals for the District of Columbia Circuit held that the "individual right to carry common firearms beyond the home for self defense—even in densely populated areas, even for those lacking special self-defense needs—falls within the core of the Second Amendment’s protections."

This decision struck down the District of Columbia's requirement that applicants for concealed carry permits demonstrate a "good reason," including a "special need for self-protection distinguishable from the general community as supported by evidence of specific threats or previous attacks that demonstrate a special danger to the applicant's life," for carrying a firearm in public.

References 

United States Second Amendment case law
2017 in United States case law
United States Court of Appeals for the District of Columbia Circuit cases